Behzad Razavi is an Iranian-American professor and researcher of electrical and electronic engineering. Noted for his research in communications circuitry, Razavi is the director of the Communication Circuits Laboratory at the University of California Los Angeles. He is a Fellow and a distinguished lecturer for the Institute of Electrical and Electronics Engineers. Among his awards, Razavi is a two-time recipient of the Beatrice Winner Award for Editorial Excellence at the 1994 and 2001 International Solid-State Circuits Conferences. In 2017, he was elected as a member into the National Academy of Engineering for contributions to low-power broadband communication circuits.

Career
Razavi attended the Sharif University of Technology in Tehran and received a BS degree in Electrical Engineering in 1985. After moving to the United States, he obtained his  master's degree and PhD degrees from Stanford University in 1988 and 1992, respectively. Razavi initially worked as an engineer for AT&T Bell Laboratories and was an adjunct professor at Princeton University from 1992 to 1994. He returned to California in 1995 to work at Hewlett-Packard while an adjunct professor at Stanford University. In 1996 he became an Associate Professor and subsequently full Professor of electrical engineering at the University of California Los Angeles. Razavi specializes in telecommunications circuitry and his research involves work with data receivers, frequency synthesizers, and phase-locking and clock recovery for high-speed data communications.

From 1993 to 2002, Razavi served on the Technical Program Committees of the International  Solid-State Circuits Conference (ISSCC), as well as for the Symposium on VLSI Circuits from  1998 to 2002. He has also worked as an editor for professional journals including the IEEE Journal of  Solid-State Circuits, IEEE Transactions on Circuits and Systems I, and the International Journal of High Speed Electronics. Razavi was acknowledged with a fellowship in the Institute of Electrical and Electronics Engineers (IEEE) in 2003 "for contributions to high-speed communication circuits". He is a distinguished lecturer for the IEEE.

He is the author/editor of seven books and is recognized as one of the top 10 authors in the 50-year history of ISSCC.

Awards
 1994 Beatrice Winner Award for Editorial Excellence, (with J. Sung), A 6GHz 60 mW BiCMOS Phase-Locked Loop with 2V Supply, International Solid-State Circuits Conference, IEEE
 1994 Best Paper Award, European Solid-State Circuits Conference, IEEE
 1995 Best Panel Award, International Solid-State Circuits Conference, IEEE
 1997 Best Panel Award, International Solid-State Circuits Conference, IEEE
 1997 Innovative Teaching Award, TRW
 1998 Best Paper Award, Custom Integrated Circuits Conference, IEEE
 2001 Beatrice Winner Award for Editorial Excellence, (with J. Savoj), A 10 Gb/s CMOS Clock and Data Recovery Circuit with Frequency Detection, International Solid-State Circuits Conference, IEEE
 2001 Jack Kilby Outstanding Student Paper Award (with L. Der), A 2 GHz CMOS Image-Reject Receiver with Sign-Sign LMS Calibration., International Solid-State Circuits Conference, IEEE
 2006 Excellence in Teaching Award, Lockheed Martin
 2007 UCLA Faculty Senate Teaching Award
 2012 IEEE Donald O. Pederson Award in Solid-State Circuits

Bibliography
Principles of Data Conversion System Design, IEEE Press, (1995)
Monolithic Phase-Locked Loops and Clock  Recovery Circuits, IEEE Press, (1996)
RF Microelectronics, Prentice Hall, (1998) (translated into Chinese and Japanese)
Design of Analog CMOS Integrated  Circuits, McGraw-Hill, (2001) (translated to Chinese, Persian and Japanese)
Design of Integrated  Circuits for Optical Communications, McGraw-Hill, (2003)
Phase-Locking in High-Performance Systems, IEEE Press, (2003)
Fundamentals of Microelectronics, Wiley, (2006)
Design of CMOS Phase-Locked Loops, Cambridge University Press, (2020)

References

External links
  Behzad Razavi at the UCLA Communication Circuits Laboratory

Iranian electrical engineers
American electrical engineers
Sharif University of Technology alumni
Iranian emigrants to the United States
Electrical engineering academics
Fellow Members of the IEEE
Living people
Iranian expatriate academics
Year of birth missing (living people)